Smuggler's Bay is a British period television drama series which aired on BBC One in 6 episodes in 1964. It is an adaptation of the 1898 adventure novel Moonfleet by J. Meade Falkner. No recordings of this production are known to exist. According to star Frazer Hines, the title was changed due to a perceived conflict with contemporaneous BBC series Moonstrike made by the same department.

Main cast
 Frazer Hines as John Trenchard
 John Phillips as Elzevir Block
 Suzanne Neve as Grace Maskew
 Robert Brown as Sam Tewkesbury
 Patrick Troughton as Ratsey
 Robert James as Mr. Glennie
 Alan Haywood as Tom Farley
 Brian Jackson as Ben Field
 Paul Curran as Magistrate Maskew
 Nancy Nevinson as Mrs. Belmore
 Margot Lister as Granny Tucker
 Henry Oscar as Aldobrand
 John Dawson as Johannes
 Jean Anderson as Aunt Jane
 Elizabeth Zinn as Rose Aldobrand
 James Langley as Tom Tully
 Alf Edwards as Ned
 Charles Hodgson as Captain Hennig

References

External links
 

BBC television dramas
1964 British television series debuts
1964 British television series endings
English-language television shows
Television shows based on British novels